Medium may refer to:

Science and technology

Aviation
Medium bomber, a class of war plane
Tecma Medium, a French hang glider design

Communication 

 Media (communication), tools used to store and deliver information or data
 Medium of instruction, a language or other tool used to educate, train, or instruct

Wave physics
 Transmission medium, in physics and telecommunications, any material substance which can propagate waves or energy
 Active laser medium (also called gain medium or lasing medium), a quantum system that allows amplification of power (gain) of waves passing through (usually by stimulated emission)
 Optical medium, in physics, a material through with electromagnetic waves propagate
 Excitable medium, a non-linear dynamic system which has the capacity to propagate a wave

Other uses in science and technology
 Data storage medium, a storage container in computing
 Growth medium (or culture medium), in biotechnology, an object in which microorganisms or cells experience growth
 Interplanetary medium, in astronomy, material which fills the solar system
 Interstellar medium, in astronomy, the matter and energy content that exists between the stars within a galaxy
 Porous medium, in engineering and earth sciences, a material that allows fluid to pass through it, such as sand
 Processing medium, in industrial engineering, a material that plays a role in manufacturing processes

Arts, entertainment, and media

Films 
 The Medium (1921 film), a German silent film
 The Medium (1951 film), a film version of the opera directed by Menotti
 The Medium (1960 film), an Australian television play
 The Medium (1992 film), an English film from Singapore
 The Medium (2021 film), a Thai film

Periodicals
 The Medium (Rutgers), an entertainment weekly at Rutgers University
 The Medium (University of Toronto Mississauga), a student newspaper at the University of Toronto Mississauga

Other arts, entertainment, and media
 List of art media (plural: media), materials and techniques used by an artist to produce a work
 Medium (TV series), an American television series starring Patricia Arquette about a medium (psychic intermediary) working as a consultant for a district attorney's office
 Medium (website), a publishing platform
 Medium Productions, a record label
 The Medium, a 1946 opera by Gian-Carlo Menotti
 Medium (band), an American rock band
 The Medium (video game), a 2021 psychological horror video game developed by Bloober Team.

People
 Medium, a practitioner of mediumship, the practice of purportedly mediating communication between spirits of the dead and living human beings
 Tau (rapper) (born 1986), Polish rapper formerly known as "Medium"

Other uses
 Medium, a doneness (gradation of cooked meat)
 Medium pace bowling, another name for fast bowling in the sport of cricket

See also 
 Channel (disambiguation)
 Conduit (disambiguation)
 Media (disambiguation)
 Median (disambiguation)
 Meidum, a pyramid in Egypt